Mantella madagascariensis, common names Malagasy painted mantella, Madagascan mantella, Madagascar golden frog, Malagasy mantella and painted mantella, is a species of frog in the family Mantellidae.

Distribution
This species is endemic to Madagascar. It is threatened by habitat loss and it may be threatened by commercial collection.

Habitat
Its natural habitats are subtropical or tropical moist lowland forest, subtropical or tropical moist montane forest, and rivers.

Description
These tiny but stout frogs are rather variable in color and markings, as they are irregularly streaked in black and yellow. Usually they have a blackish body, but the dorsum is commonly black. A green or yellowish rostral stripe is running along the head. Femur and humerus are usually yellow to green, while tibia, tarsus and foot are reddish-orange, with blackish patches. Blotches of yellow-green color extends to flanks close to the forelimbs.

Some authors consider Mantella madagascariensis a complex of cryptic species.

This species is closely related to Mantella pulchra and very similar to Mantella baroni.

Biology
Little is known about the biology of the species. These frogs are terrestrial and are active on the ground during the day. They prefer forest and forest edge, especially along streams. Breeding occurs in streams. Females lay eggs on land, but the larvae develop in water streams. Like all Mantella species, these frogs has several toxic alkaloids in its skin.

Bibliography
Chiari, Y., M. Vences, D. R. Vieites, F. C. E. Rabemananjara, P. Bora, O. R. Ravoahangimalala, and A. Meyer. 2004. New evidence for parallel evolution of colour patterns in Malagasy poison frogs (Mantella). Molecular Ecology 13: 376303774
Daly, J. W., N. R. Andriamaharavo, M. Andriantsiferana, and C. W. Myers. 1996. Madagascan poison frogs (Mantella) and their skin alkaloids. American Museum Novitates 3177: 1–34.
Glaw, F., and M. Vences. 2006. Complete classification of species in the family Mantellidae Laurent, 1946. Organisms, Diversity & Evolution, Electronic Supplement 11(1): 1–3.
Glaw, F., and M. Vences. 2007. A Field Guide to the Amphibians and Reptiles of Madagascar. Third edition. Cologne: Vences & Glaw Verlag
Stuart, S. N., M. Hoffmann, J. Chanson, N. Cox, R. Berridge, P. Ramani, and B. Young eds., 2008. Threatened Amphibians of the World. Barcelona, Spain; International Union for the Conservation of Nature, Gland. Switzerland; Conservation International, Arlington, Virginia, U.S.A.: Lynx Editions.
Vences, M., F. Glaw, and W. Böhme. 1999. A review of the genus Mantella (Anura, Ranidae, Mantellinae): taxonomy, distribution and conservation of Malagasy poison frogs. Alytes. Paris 17: 3–72

References

Mantella
Endemic frogs of Madagascar
Species endangered by the pet trade
Taxonomy articles created by Polbot
Amphibians described in 1872
Taxa named by Alfred Grandidier